Tezcatlipoca is a name used by two distinct fictional characters appearing as supervillains in DC Comics publications and related media.

The first Tezcatlipoca is a character based on the eponymous Aztec mythological figure, a powerful deity of conflict, nighttime and sorcery, who commonly appears as a recurring adversary of the superheroes Wonder Woman and Aztek. He debuted as a treacherous ally of Wonder Woman's foe Circe in 1984's Wonder Woman (vol. 1) #314 by writer Dan Mishkin and illustrator Don Heck, and went on to battle Wonder Woman several times as an independent agent. After Crisis on Infinite Earths, the 1985 publication event that rebooted DC Comics' continuity, Tezcatlipoca was re-imagined by creative team Grant Morrison, Mark Millar and N. Steven Harris as an enemy for Uno, the titular hero of their 1996 ongoing series Aztek, the Ultimate Man. As part of his 1999 World War III story line in JLA #36-41, Morrison would reveal that Tezcatlipoca was in fact the planet-destroying machine known as Mageddon, whom Uno ultimately defeats by sacrificing his life. Tezcatlipoca would be returned to his roots as an Aztec god after DC's Rebirth continuity reboot, squaring off against the combined might of Nayeli Constant (the second Aztek), Wonder Woman and Artemis in 2018's Wonder Woman (vol. 5) #53-54. 

The second Tezcatlipoca Chama Sierra, is not a deity but a human-turned-werejaguar who believes himself to be the earthly avatar of the eponymous Aztec god. He has commonly appeared as an adversary of the superhero Connor Hawke, debuting in 1995's Green Arrow (vol. 2) #102, by writer Chuck Dixon and illustrator Rodolfo Damaggio.

Tezcatlipoca I

Fictional character biography
The Aztec god Tezcatlipoca was able to reenter the human world when he found a human host. He became a consort of Circe, aiding and ultimately betraying her as she battled the pre-Crisis Wonder Woman.

Tezcatlipoca, trickster god, was manipulating the U.S. government and its intervention in the affairs of the fictional Central American county Tropidor. Lt. Keith Griggs of Air Force intelligence was sent to investigate possible illegal arms sales from U.S. intelligence officers to Tropidor militants when he crash landed in Circe's hidden jungle lair. Wonder Woman's alter ego, Lt. Diana Prince, was sent to investigate, and waged battle with Circe to free Griggs and the other men enslaved in animal form.

When Circe called upon her unseen lover for aid, a powerful bolt of lightning came down from the sky. Wonder Woman used both her bracelets to deflect the lightning, but they were fused together. As she had just had her bracelets bound by a man, she was rendered powerless until she persuaded Griggs, trapped in the form of a ram/man hybrid, to charge her and use the force of his collision to break the bracelets apart. Wonder Woman deflected more lightning bolts, unwittingly sending the fiery bolts to burn down Circe's patch of immortality-granting herbs. Tezcatlipoca then imprisoned Circe in his obsidian mirror, turned Wonder Woman into a powerless Diana Prince, and revealed himself.

In the ensuing adventure, Wonder Woman discovered a hitherto lost tribe of Amazons under Tezcatlipoca's spell and freed them by releasing an eagle, the symbol of Amazon strength, from a mystical cage. Taunted by the trickster god in a hall of mirrors with various versions of herself, Wonder Woman reclaimed her confidence, smashed his mirror, and reemerged with her powers reclaimed. She sent Tezcatlipoca away by smashing a figurine of the god fused with a man, thus freeing his human host and banishing him to his godly realm, though not before he reminded her that he had already sown the seeds of madness in Tropidor.

When Lt. Griggs and fellow officer Lt. Lauren Haley were sent again to Tropidor a year later, Wonder Woman followed them and rescued them from Tezcatlipoca's clutches, after triumphantly breaking a time loop in which the mad god repeatedly slew Griggs. The Aztec temple scene they were in dissolved to reveal a world caught up in the Crisis on Infinite Earths.

Although Tezcatlipoca has not been seen post-Crisis, his name was invoked in the series Aztek as the malevolent force that the Q Society was bracing for. Aztek's story ended when Tezcatlipoca was apparently revealed to be the planet-destroying machine Mageddon.

Powers and abilities
Tezcatlipoca I wielded an array of godlike powers to warp time and reality to his whims.

Tezcatlipoca II

Fictional character biography
During the Underworld Unleashed storyline, Chama Sierra made a deal with the demon Neron for power in exchange for his soul. Neron gave Chama the powers and form of a jaguar, and Chama believed himself to be the Aztec jaguar god, Tezcatlipoca. He attempted to use his powers for evil, but was stopped by Connor Hawke, the second Green Arrow. He managed to escape from the young hero.

Later, he met the villainess Panara and found a kindred spirit in the leopard woman. The two fell in love and became a criminal pair until Tezcatlipoca was exposed to Joker's "laughing gas" which made him insane. Tezcatlipoca and Panara went on a killing spree until they were stopped by Robin and Blue Beetle and sent to prison.

Powers and abilities
Tezcatlipoca II has all of the natural abilities of a jaguar. His strength, speed, and agility have been mystically enhanced beyond human levels. He also has retractable claws and night vision. He is prone to bouts of bestial rage, and has been known to attack and eat other humans.

See also
 List of Wonder Woman enemies

References

External links
 Recaps of WW #313, 314, 315, & 316
 Recaps of WW #326 and 327

Articles about multiple fictional characters
DC Comics characters who can move at superhuman speeds
DC Comics characters with superhuman strength
DC Comics deities
DC Comics supervillains
DC Comics male supervillains
Mythology in DC Comics
Comics characters introduced in 1984
Comics characters introduced in 1995
Characters created by Chuck Dixon
Characters created by Don Heck
Fictional werecats